Wallace County is one of the 141 Cadastral divisions of New South Wales. The Snowy River is the boundary to the south and south-east, and the Murrumbidgee River is the northern boundary. It includes the area around Jindabyne.

Wallace County was named in honour of Sir John Alexander Dunlop Agnew Wallace (1775-1857) Sixth Baronet.

Parishes within this county
A full list of parishes found within this county; their current LGA and mapping coordinates to the approximate centre of each location is as follows:

References

Counties of New South Wales